Endomorphin-2 (EM-2) is an endogenous opioid peptide and one of the two endomorphins. It has the amino acid sequence Tyr-Pro-Phe-Phe-NH2.  It is a high affinity, highly selective agonist of the μ-opioid receptor, and along with endomorphin-1 (EM-1), has been proposed to be the actual endogenous ligand of this receptor (that is, rather than the endorphins). Like EM-1, EM-2 produces analgesia in animals, but whereas EM-1 is more prevalent in the brain, EM-2 is more prevalent in the spinal cord. In addition, the action of EM-2 differs from that of EM-1 somewhat, because EM-2 additionally induces the release of dynorphin A and [Met]enkephalin in the spinal cord and brain by an unknown mechanism, which in turn go on to activate the κ- and δ-opioid receptors, respectively, and a portion of the analgesic effects of EM-2 is dependent on this action. Moreover, while EM-1 produces conditioned place preference, a measure of drug reward, EM-2 produces conditioned place aversion, an effect which is dynorphin A-dependent. Similarly to the case of EM-1, the gene encoding for EM-2 has not yet been identified.

See also
 β-Endorphin

References

Mu-opioid receptor agonists
Neuropeptides